Jacques Aymar de Roquefeuil du Bousquet (14 November 1665, in château du Bousquet, Montpeyroux, Rouergue – 8/9 March 1744) was a French Navy admiral.

Family
He was a member of the de Roquefeuil-Blanquefort family from Languedoc in France. His father left him the hereditary government of the town of Rodez, which the king invested him with upon his marriage in 1711. His mother was Victoire de Moret, granddaughter of Madeleine de Bourbon.

On 4 August 1712, he married Jeanne Louise du Main d'Angeret, and they had:
 Aymar-Joseph, Vice Amiral of France
 René-Aymar, Chef d'escadre

1665 births
1744 deaths
French Navy admirals
Admirals of France
Knights of the Order of Saint Louis